Cibola White Ware is a ceramic tradition of Arizona and New Mexico, dating from .

History
The ware was produced roughly from the San Juan River south to the upper Gila River drainage, and from the White Mountains east to the Laguna Pueblo area (Goetze and Mills 1993:21) and probably east into the Rio Grande drainage. Cibola White Ware shares its basic style (black designs painted on a white or light gray background) with a number of other regional wares, all produced by prehistoric Puebloan peoples. The various wares often shared stylistic ideas, and archaeologists make the various fine distinctions primarily to aid them in dating archaeological deposits and in tracing out prehistoric trade.

Classification
Most Cibola White Ware is distinguished from most other black-on-white wares by the use of crushed sherd temper in the preparation of clay for firing, along with the use of mineral-based black paint. If sherd temper is combined with black plant-based paint, the pottery is instead classified as Little Colorado White Ware (produced in the Little Colorado River drainage), with one exception, Chaco-McElmo Black-on-white. Also, some early Cibola White Ware vessels have mixed sand and sherd temper or all sand temper. The following table may help the reader understand where archaeologists have drawn the lines between one prehistoric ware and the next (see Goetze and Mills 1993:27–29 for further assistance).

Notes

References
Goetze, Christine E., and Barbara J. Mills, 1993, Classification Criteria for Types and Wares. In Across the Colorado Plateau: Anthropological Studies for the Transwestern Pipeline Project, Volume 16, Interpretation of Ceramic Artifacts, by Barbara J. Milles, Christine E. Goetze, and Maria Nieves Zedeńo, pp. 21–85. Office of Contract Archaeology and Maxwell Museum of Anthropology, University of New Mexico, Albuquerque.

External links
 Cibola Whiteware photo gallery
 Cibola White Ware  at Northern Arizona University

Pueblo ceramics
White Mountains (Arizona)
Archaeology of the Americas
Pre-Columbian art